Arthur Redvers Randell (11 July 1901 – March 1988) wrote about life in the English Fens.

Biography
Randell was born near the River Great Ouse at Wiggenhall St Mary Magdalen, Norfolk, in the United Kingdom. During his early life he made a living from being a railway worker for Great Eastern Railway, LNER and British Rail and a molecatcher, the fourth generation in his family. He worked on the railways for 47 years mostly at Waldersea siding signal box.

He was a great authority on the Fens and its people and customs. He wrote about the blacksmith who was forced to turn to repairing farm implements and kitchen implements, the chimney sweep, the harness maker, the pig-killer, the straw worker, the maker of corn dollies and many other now extinct trades.

Later he wrote a number of books which were edited by Enid Porter and published. He was a popular speaker at community groups and made several TV appearances.  Interviewed by Anglia TV's Dick Joice and featured in one of the Byegones books.

In a letter published in a local newspaper he wrote that he had nearly finished a hand written manuscript for a book of ghosts, witches and haunted houses, this does not appear to have been published. By this time Enid Porter, the editor of his earlier publications had retired.

Death 
Randell died on Saturday 26th March in the North Cambridgeshire Hospital, Wisbech. His funeral service was held at Friday Bridge Church and he was interred at Elm Cemetery.

Bibliography

 Sixty Years a Fenman (London Routledge & Kegan Paul, 1966) - Arthur Randell, edited by Enid Porter
 Fenland Railwayman (London Routledge & Kegan Paul, 1968) - Arthur Randell, edited by Enid Porter
 Fenland Memories (London Routledge & Kegan Paul, 1969) - Arthur Randell, edited by Enid Porter
 Fenland Molecatcher (London Routledge & Kegan Paul, 1970) - Arthur Randell, edited by Enid Porter

Footnotes

External links
 River Great Ouse and its route through the Fens

1901 births
English writers
People from King's Lynn and West Norfolk (district)
1988 deaths